George Martin Ottinger (8 February 1833, Springfield Township – 28 October 1917, Salt Lake City) was an American public official, artist, educator, actor and photographer, who spent most of his career in Utah.

Biography
He was born in Springfield Township, Montgomery County, Pennsylvania and then raised in New York City. He was raised as a Quaker. At age 17 (in 1850), he joined the crew of a whaling ship. By age 20 he had circumnavigated the globe and done gold digging in California. He then studied art under Robert Weir for a time, before going to the Pennsylvania Academy of Fine Arts. For the next two years, he worked as a painter of miniatures in Lancaster, Pennsylvania.  He then moved to Kentucky where he worked as a photograph tinter as well as a fruit merchant.

In 1857, he returned to Pennsylvania to continue to study art. The following year, he joined the Church of Jesus Christ of Latter-day Saints (LDS Church) at the urging of his mother. In 1859 he went to Richmond, Virginia where he worked as an artist. 

He came to Utah Territory as part of the Milo Andrus Pioneer Company in 1861 and formed a partnership with the photographer Charles Roscoe Savage. There was so little demand for their work in Salt Lake City that for part of 1861 they traveled through Idaho Territory, doing jobs related to photography. He also did scenery painting for the Salt Lake Theatre as well as acting. In 1863, he became principal of the Deseret Academy of Arts, which was another joint venture with Savage.

Also in 1861, he married Mary Jane McAllister Cullin. They had only one child before she died. In 1864, he married Phoebe Neslen.

Three years later, he began painting a series on the Spanish conquest of the Americas, beginning with "The Last of the Aztecs".  In 1879, he went to Europe with Savage as an art missionary, to improve his artistic skills. On his return, he did murals in the St. George, Logan and Manti Temples.

From 1876 to 1890, he was head of the Salt Lake Fire Department, overseeing its transformation from a volunteer to a paid organization in 1883. He also taught art at the University of Deseret, beginning in 1881 and continuing until 1892. He was a key influence on many later Utah artists.

For many years he was part of the Nauvoo Legion. In 1894, he was appointed Adjutant General of Utah, and in this position oversaw the organization of the Utah National Guard.

References

Further reading
 Biography of Ottinger @ the Marriott Library
 Biography of Ottinger @ AskArt
 Pslmquist, Peter E. and Thomas R. Kailbourn. Pioneer Photographers of the Far West, 1840-1865 (Stanford: University Press, 2000) p. 425-426.

External links 

 George M. Ottinger Photo Collection, Utah Department of Heritage and Arts

1833 births
1917 deaths
Converts to Mormonism from Quakerism
Latter Day Saint artists
Mormon pioneers
Pennsylvania Academy of the Fine Arts alumni
People from Montgomery County, Pennsylvania
Artists from New York City
University of Utah faculty
Artists from Utah
Latter Day Saints from New York (state)
Latter Day Saints from Pennsylvania
Latter Day Saints from Kentucky
Latter Day Saints from Utah
Latter Day Saints from Virginia
Utah National Guard personnel